Johan Brunström and Frederik Nielsen were the defending champions but decided not to participate.
Andrey Golubev and Yuri Schukin won the title by defeating Teymuraz Gabashvili and Stefano Ianni 7–6(7–4), 5–7, [10–7] in the final.

Seeds

Draw

Draw

References
 Main Draw

Internazionali di Monza e Brianza - Doubles
2012 Doubles